Municipality of San Ignacio is a municipality in Sinaloa in northwestern Mexico.

Political subdivision 
San Ignacio Municipality is subdivided in 8 sindicaturas:
Central de San Ignacio
Estación Dimas
Contraestaca
Ixpalino
Coyotitán
San Juan
Ajoya
San Javier

References

Municipalities of Sinaloa

de:San Ignacio (Sinaloa)
es:San Ignacio (Sinaloa)
nl:San Ignacio (Sinaloa)